The 1947 Connecticut Huskies football team was an American football team represented the University of Connecticut in the Yankee Conference during the 1947 college football season.  The Huskies were led by 13th-year head coach J. Orlean Christian and completed the season with a record of 4–4.  This marked the first season of competition in the Yankee Conference, as the New England Conference disbanded after the 1946 season with Northeastern's announced departure.  The remaining members joined with UMass and Vermont to create the new conference.

Schedule

References

Connecticut
UConn Huskies football seasons
Connecticut Huskies football